Sher Shah Suri (1472, or 1486 – 22 May 1545), born Farīd Khān, was the founder of the Sur Empire in India, with its capital in Sasaram in modern-day Bihar. He standardized the silver coin to the weight of 178 grams and named the currency as rupee based on the ancient Sanskrit term for silver. Sher Shah took control of the Mughal Empire in 1540 CE. After his accidental death in 1545 CE, his son Islam Shah became his successor. The influence of his innovations and reforms extended far beyond his brief reign; his arch foe, Humayun, referred to him as “Ustad-I-Badshahan”, teacher of kings. In the seven years of his reign he never lost a battle.

Sher Shah is of Pashtun/Pathan ethnicity, with his name denoting his tribe, Sur. He first served as a private before rising to become a commander in the Mughal army under Babur and then the governor of Bihar. In 1537, when Babur's son Humayun was elsewhere on an expedition, Sher Shah overran the state of Bengal and established the Suri dynasty. A brilliant strategist, Sher Shah proved himself as a gifted administrator as well as a capable general. His reorganization of the empire laid the foundations for the later Mughal emperors, notably Akbar, son of Humayun.

During his five-year rule from 1540 to 1545, he set up a new economic and military administration, issued the first Rupiya from "Tanka" and organized the postal system of the Indian Subcontinent. He extended the Grand Trunk Road from Chittagong in the frontiers of the province of Bengal in northeast India to Kabul in Afghanistan in the far northwest of the country. Suri further developed Humayun's Dina-panah city and named it Shergarh and revived the historical city of Pataliputra, which had been in decline since the 7th century CE, as Patna. Some of his strategies and contributions were later idolized by the Mughal emperors, most notably Akbar.

Early life and origin
His grandfather Ibrahim Khan Sur, who started out as a horse trader, became a landlord (Jagirdar) in Narnaul area (present-day Haryana), representing his patron Jamal Khan Lodi Sarangkhani, who assigned him a few villages in Hissar. Sikandar Lodi appointed Sarangkhani, who supported Sikandar's struggle to the throne, as governor of Jaunpur area (present-day Uttar Pradesh) after its conquest. Jamal's son and successor Khan-i-Azam Ahmad Khan Sarangkhani, with a rank of 20,000 sawars, further appointed Ibrahim Sur's son Hasan, a leader of Afghan freebooters, to the iqta of Sasaram and Khawaspur-Thanda with a rank of 500 sawars.

Mazar of Suri's grandfather Ibrahim Khan Sur still stands as a monument in Narnaul.

Historian Satish Chandra writes that, "We do not know precisely when and where Farid, later Sher Shah, was born. The consensus of opinion among modern scholars is that he was born in Narnaul in 1486 or so, during the reign of Bahlol Lodi." However, the online Encyclopædia Britannica states that he was born in Sasaram (Bihar), in the Rohtas district.

He was one of eight sons of Hassan Khan. Farid came to Jaunpur, where he studied literature, poetry, and history.

During his early age, Farid was given a village in Fargana, Delhi (comprising present-day districts of Bhojpur, Buxar, Bhabhua of Bihar)  by Omar Khan Sarwani, an ethnic Pashtun himself, the counselor and courtier of Bahlul Khan Lodi. Farid Khan and his father, a jagirdar of Sasaram in Bihar, who had several wives, did not get along for a while so he decided to run away from home. When his father discovered that he fled to serve Jamal Khan, the governor of Jaunpur, Uttar Pradesh, he wrote Jamal Khan a letter that stated: Jamal Khan had advised Farid to return home but he refused. Farid replied in a letter:

His surname 'Suri' was taken from his Pashtun Sur tribe. He was a distant kinsman to Babur's brother-in-law, Mir Shah Jamal, who remained loyal to Humayun. The name Sher (means lion or tiger in the older pronunciation of Persian) was conferred upon him for his courage, when as a young man, he killed a tiger that leapt suddenly upon the king of Bihar.

Conquest of Bihar and Bengal

Farid Khan started his service under Bahar Khan Lohani, the Mughal Governor of Bihar. Because of his valour, Bahar Khan rewarded him the title Sher Khan (Lion Lord). After the death of Bahar Khan, Sher Khan became the regent ruler of the minor Sultan, Jalal Khan. Later sensing the growth of Sher Shah's power in Bihar, Jalal sought the assistance of Ghiyasuddin Mahmud Shah, the independent Sultan of Bengal. Ghiyasuddin sent an army under General Ibrahim Khan. But, Sher Khan defeated the force at the battle of Surajgarh in 1534 after forming an alliance with Ujjainiya Rajputs under Gajpati Ujjainia and other local chiefdoms. Thus he achieved complete control of Bihar.

In 1537, Sher Khan attacked Bengal and defeated Ghiyasuddin Mahmud Shah. But he could not capture the kingdom because of the sudden expedition of Emperor Humayun. On 26 June 1539, Sher Khan faced Humayun in the Battle of Chausa and defeated him. Assuming the title Farīd al-Dīn Shēr Shah, he defeated Humayun once again at the Battle of Kannauj in May 1540 and forced him out of India.

Conquest of Malwa
After the death of Bahadur Shah of Gujarat in 1537, Qadir Shah became the new ruler of Malwa Sultanate. He then turned for support towards the Rajput and Muslim noblemen of the Khilji rule of Malwa. Puran Mal and Bhupat Rai, sons of Raja Silhadi, accepted service under the regime of Malwa in recognition of their interest in the Raisen region. By 1540, Bhupat Rai had died and Puran Mal had become the dominant force in eastern Malwa. In 1542, Sher Shah conquered Malwa without a fight and Qadir Shah fled to Gujarat. He then appointed Shuja'at Khan as the governor of Malwa who reorganised the administration and made Sarangpur the seat of Malwa's government. Sher Shah then ordered Puran Mal to be brought before him. Puran Mal agreed to accept his lordship and left his brother Chaturbhuj under Sher Shah's service. In exchange Sher Shah vowed to safeguard Puran Mal and his land.

The Muslim women of Chanderi, which Sher Shah had taken under his rule, came to him and accused Puran Mal of killing their husbands and enslaving their daughters. They threatened to denounce Sher Shah on the Day of Resurrection if he did not avenge them. Upon reminding them of his pledge to safeguard Puran Mal, they told him to consult his ulema. The ulema issued a fatwa declaring that Puran Mal deserved death. Sher Shah later had his troops encircle Puran Mal's camp. Upon seeing this, Puran Mal beheaded his wife and ordered the other Rajputs to kill their families too. Nizamuddin Ahmad writes that 4,000 Rajputs of importance were there. `Abd al-Qadir Bada'uni puts the number of Rajputs at 10,000.

Historian Abbas Sarwani describes a scene of the battle thus, "While the Hindus were employed in putting their women and families to death, the Afghans on all sides commenced the slaughter of the Hindus. Puran Mal and his companions... failed not to exhibit valour and gallantry, but in the twinkling of an eye all were slain." Only a few women and children survived. Puran Mal's daughter was given to minstrels to be a dancing girl while his three nephews were castrated. As an excuse for the treachery, Sher Shah claimed it as a revenge for enslavement of Muslim women and that he had once, when seriously ill, pledged to wipe out the Rajputs of Raisen.

Conquest of Marwar

In 1543, Sher Shah Suri with a force of 80,000 cavalry set out against Maldeo Rathore, the Rajput king of Marwar. Maldeo Rathore with an army of 50,000 cavalry advanced to face Sher Shah's army. Instead of marching to the enemy's capital Sher Shah halted in the village of Sammel in the pargana of Jaitaran, ninety kilometres east of Jodhpur. After one month of skirmishing, Sher Shah's position became critical owing to the difficulties of food supplies for his huge army. To resolve this situation, Sher Shah resorted to a cunning ploy. One evening, he dropped forged letters near the Maldeo's camp in such a way that they were sure to be intercepted. These letters indicated, falsely, that some of Maldeo's army commanders were promising assistance to Sher Shah. This caused great consternation to Maldeo, who immediately (and wrongly) suspected his commanders of disloyalty. Maldeo left for Jodhpur with his own men, abandoning his commanders to their fate.

After that Maldeo's innocent generals Jaita and Kumpa fought with just a few thousand men against an enemy force of 80,000 men and cannons. In the ensuing battle of Sammel (also known as battle of Giri Sumel), Sher Shah emerged victorious, but several of his generals lost their lives and his army suffered heavy losses. Sher Shah is said to have commented that "for a few grains of bajra (millet, which is the main crop of barren Marwar) I almost lost the entire kingdom of Hindustan."

According to Mughal historian Badauni, Sher Shah's use of elephant troops helped him defeat the Rajput army.

After this victory, Sher Shah's general Khawas Khan Marwat took possession of Jodhpur and occupied the territory of Marwar from Ajmer to Mount Abu in 1544.

Government and administration

The system of tri-metalism which came to characterise Mughal coinage was introduced by Sher Shah. While the term rūpya had previously been used as a generic term for any silver coin, during his rule the term rūpee came to be used as the name for a silver coin of a standard weight of 178 grains, which was the precursor of the modern rupee. Rupee is today used as the national currency in India, Indonesia, Maldives, Mauritius, Nepal, Pakistan, Seychelles, Sri Lanka among other countries. Gold coins called the Mohur weighing 169 grains and copper coins called Paisa were also minted by his government. According to numismatists Goron and Goenka, it is clear from coins dated AH 945 (1538 AD) that Sher Khan had assumed the royal title of Farid al-Din Sher Shah and had coins struck in his own name even before the battle of Chausa.

Sher Shah was responsible for greatly rebuilding and modernizing the Grand Trunk Road, a major artery which runs all the way from modern day Bangladesh to Afghanistan. Caravanserais (inns) and mosques were built and trees were planted along the entire stretch on both sides of the road to provide shade to travelers. Wells were also dug, especially along the western section. He also established an efficient postal system, with mail being carried by relays of horse riders.

Sher Shah built several monuments including Rohtas Fort (now a UNESCO World Heritage Site in Pakistan), many structures in the Rohtasgarh Fort in Bihar, the Sher Shah Suri Masjid in Patna, the Qila-i-Kuhna mosque inside the Purana Qila complex in Delhi, and the Sher Mandal, an octagonal building also inside the Purana Qila complex, which later served as the library of Humayun. He built a new city, Bhera, in present-day Pakistan in 1545, including within it a grand masjid named after him.

Sher Shah is generally viewed as tolerant of Hindus, except in the massacre following the surrender of Raisen.

Tarikh-i-Sher Shahi (History of Sher Shah), written by Abbas Khan Sarwani, a waqia-navis under later Mughal Emperor, Akbar around 1580, provides a detailed documentation about Sher Shah's administration.

Death and succession

Sher Shah started the siege of Kalinjar in 1543 and was killed on 22 May 1545 during the siege of Kalinjar fort. When all tactics to subdue this fort failed, Sher Shah ordered the walls of the fort to be blown up with gunpowder, but he was seriously wounded as a result of the explosion of a mine when the Rajput garrison of the fort attacked his encampment at night. He was succeeded by his son, Jalal Khan, who then continued the siege and slaughtered the whole Rajput garrison of Kalinjar fort and took the title of Islam Shah Suri. His mausoleum, the Sher Shah Suri Tomb (122 ft high), stands in the middle of an artificial lake at Sasaram, a town on the Grand Trunk Road.

Legacy

Destruction of cities
Sher Shah suri is accused by ʽAbd al-Qadir Badayuni and other Muslim historians for destroying old cities while founding new ones on their ruins after his own name. Shergarh is one of the prime examples, representing a deserted town with a fort in ruins, which, in old times, used to be a thriving place where Hinduism, Buddhism and Jainism co-existed peacefully. This can be evidently derived from the various inscriptions found in the area. Sher Shah is also said to have destroyed Dinpanah, which Humayun was constructing as the "sixth city of Delhi". The new city, Shergarh, built by him, was itself destroyed in 1555 after Humayun re-conquered the territory from the Surs. Tarikh-i-Da'udi states, however, that he destroyed Siri. Abbas Sarwani states that he had the older city of Delhi destroyed. Tarikh-i-Khan Jahan states that Salim Shah Suri had built a wall around Humayun's imperial city.

In popular culture 
Sher Khan (1962) an Indian Hindi-language action film by Radhakant starring Kamaljeet in the titular role along with Kumkum is ostensibly based on the emperor's life. Shershah Suri, a television show about the emperor was aired on DD National by Doordarshan, the Indian national public broadcaster.

See also
 Isa Khan Niazi
 Haibat Khan Niazi
 Shere Khan
 Pathans in Bihar
 List of rulers of Bengal
 Jahangir Kabir (politician)
 History of Bangladesh
 History of India
 Shershabadia community

References

Further reading
 Tarikh-i-Sher Shahi
 Tarikh-i Khan Jahani wa Makhzan-i Afghani
 Edward Thomas (1871) The Chronicles of the Pathan Kings of Delhi
 Sir Olaf Caroe, The Pathans
 
 "Sher Shah Suri; A Fresh Perspective"; Bashir Ahmad Khan Matta (Oxford University Press, Karachi, Pakistan) 2006

External links
 The earliest extant account of Sher Shah Sur
 Roads and Sarais (inns) of Sher Shah Suri
 Cannons of Sher Shah Suri
 Sher Shah Suri aimed at eradicating poverty from his empire

Sur Empire
1486 births
1545 deaths
Indian people of Pashtun descent
16th-century Indian Muslims
15th-century Indian monarchs
Pashtun people
People from Bihar
People from Rohtas District
16th-century Indian monarchs
City founders